The Prestige Hotels & Resorts Curling Classic is an annual curling tournament on the men's and women's curling tour. It is held at the Vernon Curling Club in Vernon, British Columbia. It was a part of the World Curling Tour until 2019 when it was discontinued. It is held at the beginning of October, with the beginning of the bonspiel sometimes occurring in September. The event has been held since 2001.

Former event names
Asham Curling Supplies / Prestige Inns Classic: 2001, 2003
Prestige Inn & Twin Anchors Houseboats Vernon Curling Classic: 2002
Twin Anchors Houseboats Vacations / Prestige Inn Classic: 2004
Twin Anchors - Prestige Inn Curling Classic: 2005
Twin Anchors Houseboat / Prestige Inns Cashspiel: 2006
Twin Anchors Houseboat Cashspiel: 2007–2008
Twin Anchors Invitational: 2009–2011
Prestige Hotels & Resorts Curling Classic: 2012–present

Past champions
Only skips names listed

Men

Women

References

External links
 Official Site

World Curling Tour events
Women's World Curling Tour events
Sport in Vernon, British Columbia
Curling in British Columbia